Steven Sands is an American golf television personality. He is best known as the lead interviewer for NBC's golf coverage. He also works with NBC's cable outlet, Golf Channel, as a studio host and play-by-play announcer.

He was given the nickname "Sandsie" by Tiger Woods.

Career History
In 1990, Steve interned at CNN Sports.

Steve has worked at the Golf Channel since 2001.

He was also part of the NBC Olympics coverage of the 2014 Winter Olympics in Sochi, Russia.  Steve served as a speed skating reporter.

Broadcast Career Highlights
As part of the NBC broadcast of the 2018 TOUR Championship, Steve interviewed Tiger Woods on the course after Tiger recorded his 80th career PGA Tour win, his first in over five years.

Personal History
Steve Sands grew up in and around Washington D.C. and remains a Washington D.C. sports fan.

He graduated from  Charles W. Woodward High School  in Montgomery County Maryland and then from Colorado State University in 1991, earning a bachelor's degree in technical journalism.

He was inducted into the Greater Washington Jewish Sports Hall of Fame in 2009.

The Sands family owns and operates Calvert Woodley Wines and Spirits, which is also home to La Cheeserie, a cheese merchant. Steve is a regular guest on The Tony Kornheiser Show. The host, Tony Kornheiser, found the name La Cheeserie amusing and asked his listeners to yell it at Steve Sands when they see him working sporting events. Steve now hears shouts of "La Cheeserie!" regularly, even in other countries like when he traveled to Scotland at the British Open in 2016.

References

External links
 https://twitter.com/SteveSandsGC

Year of birth missing (living people)
Living people
American television sports announcers
Colorado State University alumni
Golf writers and broadcasters
Television personalities from Washington, D.C.
Olympic Games broadcasters